"I Love You Babe" is a song written, co-produced and performed by American contemporary R&B singer Babyface, issued as the lead single from his debut studio album Lovers. The song peaked at #8 on the Billboard R&B chart in 1987.

Chart positions

References

External links
 
 

1986 songs
1986 debut singles
Babyface (musician) songs
SOLAR Records singles
Song recordings produced by L.A. Reid
Song recordings produced by Babyface (musician)
Songs written by Babyface (musician)
Post-disco songs
Funk songs